CMI may refer to:

Brands and enterprises 
 C-Media Electronics, Inc., Taiwanese computer hardware company
 Chicago Musical Instruments (est. 1920), musical instrument distributor and parent company of Gibson Guitars (1944-1969) and Epiphone Guitars
 Chimei Innolux Corporation, Taiwanese TFT-LCD panel manufacturer
Citibank Mortgage, Inc.
 CMI Gold & Silver Inc., one of the oldest precious metals bullion dealers in the United States
 Cockerill Maintenance & Ingénierie, Belgian engineering company
 Computer Memories Inc., a defunct hard disk drive manufacturer
 Continental Micronesia, Inc., ICAO code CMI, a company which was a wholly owned subsidiary of Continental Airlines
 Cummins, Inc., a manufacturer of diesel engines
 Fairlight CMI, the Fairlight Computer Musical Instrument, a digital synthesizer, sampler and digital audio workstation introduced in 1979 by Fairlight

Computing and technology
 Coded mark inversion, a non-return-to-zero (NRZ) line code
 Content Management Interface, an Open Mobile Alliance enabler that provides a standardized way for content providers to interact with service providers (network operators)

Economics and finance 
 Chiang Mai Initiative, a multi-lateral currency swap among ASEAN+3 countries
 Credit Managers' Index, an economic indicator tracking the manufacturing and service sectors

Healthcare 
 Case mix index, a relative value assigned to a diagnosis-related group of patients
 Cell-mediated immunity, an immune response that does not involve antibodies but rather involves the activation of phagocytes
 Chronic Mental Illness

Organizations and institutes 
 Cambridge–MIT Institute, a partnership between the University of Cambridge in Cambridge, England, and the Massachusetts Institute of Technology in Cambridge, Massachusetts
 Carmelites of Mary Immaculate, a religious institute for men in the Syro-Malabar Church, founded in India
Center for Medicare and Medicaid Innovation, an executive branch agency within Centers for Medicare and Medicaid Services
 Chartered Management Institute, professional institution for management based in the United Kingdom
 Chennai Mathematical Institute, a research and education institute in Chennai, India
 Chinese Maritime Institute, a non-profit institute based in the Taipei City, Taiwan
 Clay Mathematics Institute, a private, non-profit foundation, based in Providence, Rhode Island
 College of the Marshall Islands, a community college
 Committee for a Marxist International
 Creation Ministries International, a non-profit young Earth creationist organisation
 Crisis Management Initiative, an independent, non-governmental organisation based in Helsinki, Finland that works to resolve conflict and to build sustainable peace
 Culture and Media Institute, a conservative American non-profit organization
 University of Illinois Willard Airport, IATA airport code

Other uses
 CMi, International Astronomical Union abbreviation for the constellation Canis Minor
 901, written CMI in Roman numerals
 Certified Master Inspector
 The Curse of Monkey Island, a video game